Vitaly Karamnov (born August 8, 1989, Moscow) is a Russian professional ice hockey center currently playing for Ermak Angarsk of the Supreme Hockey League.

At the 2007 IIHF World U18 Championships Karamnov won gold medal.

Career statistics

Regular season and playoffs

International

External links

1989 births
Living people
Dinamo Riga players
Ice hockey people from Moscow
HC Dynamo Moscow players
Everett Silvertips players
HC Lev Praha players
HC Ryazan players
Russian ice hockey centres
HC Sibir Novosibirsk players
Sokol Krasnoyarsk players
Yermak Angarsk players
HC Yugra players
HK Riga players
HC Donbass players
Saryarka Karagandy players
Russian expatriate sportspeople in Kazakhstan
Russian expatriate sportspeople in the United States
Russian expatriate sportspeople in the Czech Republic
Russian expatriate sportspeople in Ukraine
Russian expatriate sportspeople in Latvia
Russian expatriate sportspeople in Romania
Expatriate ice hockey players in Kazakhstan
Expatriate ice hockey players in the United States
Expatriate ice hockey players in the Czech Republic
Expatriate ice hockey players in Ukraine
Expatriate ice hockey players in Latvia
Expatriate ice hockey players in Romania
Russian expatriate ice hockey people